James Wadsworth may refer to:

 James Wadsworth (Jesuit) (1572–1623), English Catholic priest and Jesuit
 James Wadsworth (Spanish scholar and pursuivant) (1604–1656?), son of the Jesuit
 James Wadsworth (lawyer) (1730–1816), American jurist and politician
 James Wadsworth (of Geneseo) (1768–1844), American pioneer and philanthropist
 James Wadsworth (mayor) (1819–1891), American politician, mayor of Buffalo, New York
 James S. Wadsworth (1807–1864), American soldier
 James Wolcott Wadsworth (1846–1926), American politician - House
 James Wolcott Wadsworth Jr. (1877–1952), American politician - Senate
 James Jeremiah Wadsworth (1905–1984), American diplomat